Coalmont was a tiny mining town,  northwest of Princeton, British Columbia, Canada,  on the north bank of the Tulameen River. The population of Coalmont is roughly 100 full-time residents. It is near the community of Tulameen and Otter Lake and the Coldwater Junction of the Coquihalla Highway. The town was established in 1912 to serve as a supply point to the neighbouring coal mine at Blakeburn.

History
Coal was first discovered in the area as early as 1858; a fully exposed vein that reportedly could be lit by a match.  When Columbia Coal and Coke moved their offices from Granite Creek to Upper Town in 1911, they gave Coalmont its name.  The area  just west of Coalmont, formerly referred to as "Cardiff", became "Upper Town", the location for the mining office, shipping terminal, power plant, company stables, school and workers' residences.  "Coalmont" was the location for stores, hotels and other businesses, and residences.  The lumber to build the necessary buildings came from their sawmill in nearby Tulameen.  The original minesite was on the hillside overlooking the south side of the Tulameen River, a bit west of Coalmont, and part of the wooden abutment for the Upper Town Bridge still survives on the south shore of the Tulameen River, about a kilometre upstream of the present bridge.  They were attempting to mine the coal from underneath, but the ground proved unstable, and the coal seams fractured.

Coalmont Collieries took over the operation in 1913, and began mining higher on the mountain, accessing the coal from above, but production and all development in the town stopped when War broke out in 1914.  After the War, owners Blake Wilson and Pat Burns reorganized the company, and resumed operations.  When the three-mile-long aerial tramway was built to carry the coal from the Blakeburn  minesite down to Coalmont, production increased from about 10,000 tons a year to over 100,000 and it eventually peaked at 167,461 tons in 1928.  The tramway operated by gravity, the full hoppers of coal moving down providing the energy to take the empty buckets back up, and it could transport a ton of coal a minute.  The Kettle Valley Railway, part of the C.P.R., originally purchased the coal for their steam engines, but quickly discovered that it burned too hot and warped the firebox grates, a similar problem to that experienced by the locals when used in their stoves.  Stove lids and grates were big sellers in the local stores!  The old KVR railbed (sans rails) is now part of the well-maintained Trans Canada Trail.

The older buildings in Coalmont, like the hotel, meat market, general store, livery stable, and the office section of the Mozey-On-Inn, date to 1911–1912, when the town was established.  The Mozey-On-Inn Office had a twin which was the post office from 1948 to 1950, and was destroyed by fire in the 1960s.  Both buildings were located on the west side of Parrish Ave. between Main St. and Front St.  The Mozey-On-Inn Office, which was the post office in 1951–1952, survived and was moved diagonally across the intersection of Main & Parrish during the 1970s.  The post office moved into the general store in 1952, and Walt Smart took over as postmaster.  Walt Smart ran the general store from 1946 to 1971, and later the Coalmont Emporium, which he built directly across the street, where the old twin post offices once sat.  His father, James, was the postmaster from 1942 to 1950, and his grandfather, W.H. Holmes, was a placer miner at Granite Creek during the Gold Rush days.

Railway
The railway arrived in Coalmont in November 1911, and although it was officially known as the Vancouver, Victoria and Eastern Railway, the line to all practical purposes was a regular Great Northern Railway branch line, as they had purchased the VV&E charter to build through Canadian territory.  The Kettle Valley Railway took over operation of the line in 1915, and in 1944 the Canadian Pacific Railway purchased the Princeton-Brookmere line outright.  The Train Station and Water Tower (which were both standard GNR designs) were located to the south side of the KVR tracks, just west of Parrish Ave., in the vacant field to the right as one turns into town from Princeton.

If you proceed west on Main St., out of town towards Tulameen, on your left you will see a large concrete pillar, which was the lower anchor point for the tramway.  The "Tipple", or lower terminal for the tramway, was a large, three-story building, and once surrounded this structure.  There are some other ruins in the area, notably the old power house, now just a foundation, and everywhere you look you can see pieces of the steel cable from the tramway, embedded in the spilled coal which litters the area.  If you look at the larger pieces of coal, you will often find veins of clear yellow amber running through it, and green amber (resinite) has also been found.  There are also large piles of "clinkers" which is fused coal ash from the power house.  Looking north, across the highway, there are still two buildings standing that were part of "Upper Town".  Just across the KVR right of way is a house, still in use, on the east side of the highway, and further to the east of it is the derelict remains of the last of the "Seven Sisters", a row of seven identical buildings that housed some of the workers.

Modern Coalmont
Coalmont had its ups and downs over the years, largely due to the mining operation which shut in 1940. Coalmont was also a junction on the Kettle Valley Railway, whose roadbed is now the Trans-Canada Trail. The Coalmont Hotel recently celebrated its 100th anniversary (2012) and its bar reopened for business in 2014. However by the summer of 2015, the bar once again closed.

Recently, coal mining (Coalmont Energy Corp.) started up again, after years of Coalmont being a lumbering and summer cabin area. (As of late 2013, the Coalmont Energy mine shut down soon after a settling pond breached its bank.)

See also
List of ghost towns in British Columbia

References

Unincorporated settlements in British Columbia
Ghost towns in British Columbia
Populated places in the Similkameen